Wang Shi-Ting (born 19 October 1973) is a retired tennis player from Taiwan.

She turned professional in 1991. In her career, she won six singles titles on the WTA Tour. She played 49 times over 11 years for Chinese Taipei Fed Cup team, earning a 51–25 overall record and setting many team records.

Wang retired from the tour in 2000. Since 2006, she has been the captain of the Chinese Taipei Fed Cup team.

WTA career finals

Singles: 7 (6 titles, 1 runner-up)

Doubles: 3 (3 runner-ups)

ITF finals

Singles (8–1)

Doubles (1–1)

External links
 
 
 

1973 births
Living people
Olympic tennis players of Taiwan
Taiwanese female tennis players
Tennis players at the 1996 Summer Olympics
Sportspeople from Tainan
Asian Games medalists in tennis
Tennis players at the 1990 Asian Games
Tennis players at the 1994 Asian Games
Tennis players at the 1998 Asian Games
Grand Slam (tennis) champions in girls' doubles
Universiade medalists in tennis
Medalists at the 1994 Asian Games
Medalists at the 1998 Asian Games
Asian Games gold medalists for Chinese Taipei
Asian Games bronze medalists for Chinese Taipei
Universiade gold medalists for Chinese Taipei
Universiade silver medalists for Chinese Taipei
Universiade bronze medalists for Chinese Taipei
French Open junior champions
Medalists at the 1995 Summer Universiade
Medalists at the 1997 Summer Universiade
Medalists at the 1999 Summer Universiade
20th-century Taiwanese women